The National Football League playoffs for the 1984 season began on December 22, 1984. The postseason tournament concluded with the San Francisco 49ers defeating the Miami Dolphins in Super Bowl XIX, 38–16, on January 20, 1985, at Stanford Stadium in Stanford, California.

Participants

Bracket

Schedule
The two wild card games were held on different days because both venues were in the Pacific Time Zone. Playoff games normally started at either 12:30 p.m. Eastern Standard Time/9:30 a.m. Pacific Standard Time or 4 p.m. EST/1 p.m. PST. The NFL did not schedule prime time playoff games on the east coast until 2002.  A 9:30 a.m. PST game was considered too early to be played on the west coast.

Starting with its coverage of Super Bowl XIX, ABC became part of the annual Super Bowl broadcasting rotation. The television rights to the first three rounds of the playoffs remained the same, with CBS televising the NFC games and NBC broadcasting the AFC games.

Wild Card playoffs

Saturday, December 22, 1984

AFC: Seattle Seahawks 13, Los Angeles Raiders 7

The Seahawks rushed on 51 plays for 205 yards and the defense intercepted 2 passes and recorded 6 sacks to avenge their AFC championship loss to LA in the previous season.  The Raiders crossed midfield only three times during the whole game, while Seattle's defense and Jeff West's punting constantly made them start each drive deep in their own territory.  Their possessions in the game started from the 20, 4, 20, 18, 16, 22, 30, 20, 16, 16, 22 and 6-yard lines.
 
Seattle quarterback Dave Krieg completed only 4 of 10 passes in the game, but one was a 26-yard touchdown throw to Daryl Turner in the second quarter.  Late in the third quarter, Seattle linebacker Bruce Scholtz forced a fumble from Frank Hawkins, and cornerback Keith Simpson recovered it on the Raiders 38.  Krieg gained 13 yards with a scramble on the next play, and Norm Johnson finished the drive with a 35-yard field goal to put the team up 10-0 with 1:29 left in the third quarter.  On LA's ensuing possession, quarterback Jim Plunkett, starting in his first game since week 6 of the regular season due to injuries, threw an interception to John Harris at the Seahawks 31-yard line, and Seattle ended up scoring another field goal on a 44-yard kick by Johnson, giving them a 13-0 lead.

With 5:05 left in the game, Plunkett threw a 47-yard touchdown pass to running back Marcus Allen.  LA's defense managed to force a punt on the next series, but only after the Seahawks ran the clock down to 45 seconds, and West's kick pinned them back at their own 6-yard line.  Seattle safety Kenny Easley then put the game away by intercepting a pass from Plunkett with 4 seconds left on the clock.

Dan Doornink recorded 29 carries for 126 rushing yards and a 14-yard reception.  Defensive end Jacob Green had 2.5 sacks.  Allen rushed for 61 yards, while also catching five passes for 90 yards and a score. This would be Seattle's last playoff victory until the 2005 NFC Divisional playoffs against the Washington Redskins.

This was the second postseason meeting between the Raiders and Seahawks. Los Angeles won the only previous meeting the previous year.

In his book about his years as a physician working for the Raiders "You're OK, It's Just a Bruise", Robert Huizenga wrote that Jacob Green's father had died suddenly in Texas right before the game, and Green was told by his mother that they were going to wait until the game was over to have Mr. Green's funeral so Jacob could be there to bury his dad. Green and his teammates dedicated the game to Mr. Green and absolutely destroyed the Raiders' offensive line on their way to victory.

Sunday, December 23, 1984

NFC: New York Giants 16, Los Angeles Rams 13

In a defensive struggle, the Giants managed to pull out a win with key defensive stands on the last two LA drives.

After forcing the Rams to punt on the opening drive, New York scored first with kicker Ali Haji-Sheikh's 37-yard field goal.  On the Rams ensuing drive, Giants linebacker Lawrence Taylor forced a fumble from Eric Dickerson, and defensive back Bill Currier recovered it at Los Angeles 23-yard line.  This set up running back Rob Carpenter's 1-yard touchdown run, giving the Giants a 10-0 lead.  Mike Lansford's 38-yard field goal in the second quarter cut the score to 10-3 going into halftime.

Haji-Sheikh kicked a 39-yard field goal in the third quarter, but this was countered by Dickerson's 14-yard touchdown run, making the score 13-10.  New York responded with Haji-Sheikh's 36-yard field goal five minutes later to go up by 6 points.  LA then took the ball back and drove to a first down on the Giants 7-yard line, with Dickerson rushing four times for 44 yards along the way.  Dickerson picked up 3 more yards on the next play, but then Giants defensive end Leonard Marshall dropped fullback Dwayne Crutchfield for a 3-yard loss and Jeff Kemp's 3rd down completion to Henry Ellard picked up just 2 yards.  Faced with 4th and goal from the 5, the Rams decided to settle for Lansford's 22-yard field goal, cutting their deficit to 16-13 with 7:02 left in the game.

Los Angeles caught a break on the Giants next possession when Joe Morris' 61-yard run was eliminated by a holding penalty against center Kevin Belcher and the team ended up punting.  This gave the Rams one last chance to drive for the tying field goal or winning touchdown at the 2:48 mark.  However, they were unable to gain even a single first down.  Faced with 4th and 6 after three plays, Kemp was sacked by George Martin and fumbled the ball.  Linebacker Andy Headen recovered for New York on the Rams 33, enabling them to run out the rest of the clock.

This game marked an impressive turnaround for the Giants, who had finished the previous year with a 3-12-1 record.  Both teams combined for just 406 yards (214 for LA, 192 for New York).  The only offensive star of the game was Dickerson, who rushed for 107 yards and a touchdown, though he rushed for only 37 yards on 12 carries in the first half, including his costly fumble.

This was the first postseason meeting between the Giants and Rams.

Divisional playoffs

Saturday, December 29, 1984

AFC: Miami Dolphins 31, Seattle Seahawks 10

The Dolphins ran off 70 plays, gained 405 yards of total offense (including an uncharacteristic 143 yards rushing), and scored 17 unanswered points in the second half as they avenged last season's divisional round upset loss to Seattle.  Meanwhile, Miami's defense, which had given up 134 points in the last five games of the season, held the Seahawks to just 267 yards.  The Dolphins defense was particularly dominating on the ground, where they held Seattle to a mere 51 yards on 18 rushing attempts, an average of less than 3 yards per carry.

Miami started off the scoring with a 68-yard drive, featuring Dan Marino's 25-yard completion to Mark Clayton, that ended on Tony Nathan's 14-yard touchdown run.  Near the end of the first quarter, Keith Simpson deflected a Marino pass into the arms of teammate John Harris, who returned the interception 32 yards to the Dolphins 39-yard line.  Miami managed to keep the Seahawks out of the end zone, but Norm Johnson kicked a 27-yard field goal to put his team on the board at 7-3.  On the Dolphins next drive, they were aided by a crucial penalty, an offsides call against the Seahawks that negated Marino's intercepted pass by Kenny Easley.  Two plays later, Marino threw a 34-yard touchdown pass to Jimmy Cefalo, increasing the Dolphins lead to 14-3.  However, Seattle quarterback Dave Krieg led his team back, firing a pass to receiver Steve Largent who caught the ball between two defenders and took off past cornerback Glen Blackwood for a 56-yard touchdown reception, cutting the score to 14-10 at the end of the half.

However, any thoughts of a Seattle comeback were quickly crushed in the second half.  Following a missed field goal attempt by Johnson, Marino led the Dolphins 76 yards down the field to a 3-yard scoring reception by tight end Bruce Hardy, making the score 21-10.  Seattle was quickly forced to punt on their next drive, and Jeff West shanked the kick, causing the ball to travel just 7 yards.  Two plays later, Miami increased their lead to 28-10 on Marino's 33-yard touchdown pass to receiver Mark Clayton.  In the fourth quarter, Dolphins kicker Uwe von Schamann made a 37-yard field goal that put the final score at 31-10.

Marino finished the game 21/34 for 262 yards and three touchdowns, with two interceptions (both by John Harris).  The Dolphins 405 yards would be spread out quite evenly among the team, as their top rusher (Nathan) had only 76 yards, while their top receiver (Clayton) had 75.  Krieg completed 20/35 passes for 234 yards and a touchdown, while also rushing for 2 yards and gaining one yard off a deflected pass that he caught himself.  Largent was the top receiver of the game with 6 receptions for 128 yards and a touchdown.

This was the second postseason meeting between the Seahawks and Dolphins. Seattle won the only prior meeting the previous year.

NFC: San Francisco 49ers 21, New York Giants 10

Quarterback Joe Montana threw for 309 yards and 3 touchdown passes as he led the 49ers to a victory, while receiver Dwight Clark caught 9 passes for 112 yards and a touchdown. The 49ers defense also played exceptionally well, holding the Giants offense to a single field goal even though Montana was intercepted 3 times.

On San Francisco's first drive of the game, Montana completed a 21-yard touchdown pass to Clark. Ronnie Lott intercepted a pass and returned it 38 yards to set up Montana's 9-yard pass to Russ Francis that gave the 49ers a 14-0 lead just 6:48 into the game. In the second quarter, Giants linebacker Gary Reasons recorded his first of two interceptions on the day setting up Ali Haji-Sheikh's 46-yard field goal.  Then linebacker Harry Carson recorded the first interception in his 9-year career and returned it 14 yards for a touchdown that cut the score to 14–10. But Montana responded with a 29-yard touchdown pass to Freddie Solomon, making the score 21-10 by the end of the second quarter.

Both defenses then controlled the rest of the game, allowing no points in the second half.  In the third quarter, New York drove to the 49ers 18-yard line, only to have Phil Simms throw an interception to linebacker Riki Ellison.  In the fourth quarter, New York moved the ball to the San Francisco 11, but Simms was sacked on third down.  Now faced with 4th and 16, they decided to play conservative and take the field goal, but Haji-Sheikh's 33-yard kick went wide right.  Following a punt, New York got the ball with 3:04 left and drove to the 49ers 22, this time turning the ball over on downs when Joe Morris was stuffed for no gain on 4th and inches.  Finally, with 53 seconds left, San Francisco's defense closed out the game when Fred Dean forced a fumble from Simms that was recovered by 49ers lineman Dwaine Board.

This was the second postseason meeting between the Giants and 49ers. San Francisco won the only prior meeting.

Sunday, December 30, 1984

NFC: Chicago Bears 23, Washington Redskins 19

The Bears upset the Redskins' bid for a third consecutive NFC championship with clutch plays and a stout defense that forced 3 turnovers and 7 sacks. Chicago's victory was Washington's first and only playoff defeat throughout their tenure at RFK Stadium.

With the scored tied 3–3 in the second quarter, the Bears executed a halfback option play at the Redskins' 19-yard line, with running back Walter Payton throwing a 19-yard touchdown to Pat Dunsmore. Then on the second play in the third period, Bears wide receiver Willie Gault caught a short pass from quarterback Steve Fuller, evaded Redskins cornerback Darrell Green who was too aggressive in trying to make an interception, and turned upfield for a 75-yard touchdown. Redskins running back John Riggins capped off a 74-yard drive with a 1-yard touchdown run then cut the lead, 16–10. But a running into the punter penalty call against Ken Coffey set up Dennis McKinnon's 16-yard reception to cap a Chicago 77-yard scoring drive to push their lead back to 13 at 23–10.

Washington attempted a comeback late in the third quarter. Rich Milot recovered a Fuller fumble at the Chicago 36-yard line, setting up a one-yard touchdown run by Riggins to cut the Bears lead to six. Then after being backed up deep in their own territory on fourth down with eight minutes left in the game, Chicago punter Dave Finzer stepped out of the end zone and gave the Redskins an intentional safety, making it 23–19. Washington then advanced to the Bears 24-yard line, but quarterback Joe Theismann threw three straight incompletions and Mark Moseley missed a 41-yard field goal attempt. Two other Washington possessions went nowhere and Chicago moved on to the NFC championship game.

Payton finished the game with a career postseason high 104 rushing yards, and caught one pass for 12.

This game would be the only time in Joe Gibbs' original tenure in Washington that his team would lose their opening playoff game. It happened for the only other time in what was Gibbs' final game in his career in the 2007-08 NFL playoffs to the Seattle Seahawks.

This was the fifth postseason meeting between the Bears and Redskins. Both teams previously split the prior four meetings.

AFC: Pittsburgh Steelers 24, Denver Broncos 17

Steelers running back Frank Pollard led the team to victory with 99 rushing yards, 4 receptions for 48 yards, and two touchdowns, the second in the game's closing minutes to the put Pittsburgh ahead for good.

The Broncos got their first chance to score after the opening drive, in which Rulon Jones's sack of Steelers quarterback Mark Malone forced a fumble that was recovered by defensive end Andre Townsend on the Steelers 23-yard line.  But Denver only gained 1 yard with their next three plays and Rich Karlis missed a 39-yard field goal attempt.  On the next play, Denver's Tom Jackson recovered a fumbled snap from Malone on the Steelers 22 set up quarterback John Elway's 9-yard touchdown pass to Jim Wright.  Pittsburgh responded by moving the ball 62 yards to the Broncos 11-yard line, where Gary Anderson's 28-yard field goal made the score 7-3. Denver then drove to a 3rd and goal from the Steelers 6-yard line, only to lose the ball when Elway threw a pass that was intercepted by Pittsburgh defensive end Gary Dunn.

Late in the second quarter, Pollard rushed 4 times for 45 yards on a 78-yard drive that ended with his 1-yard touchdown run, giving the Steelers a 10-7 lead with 1:14 left in the half.

Denver tied the game in the third period when safety Roger Jackson blocked a punt give them a first and goal on the Pittsburgh 4-yard line, leading to Karlis' 21-yard field goal. The next time Denver got the ball, they drove 54 yards to take a 17-10 lead on Elway's 20-yard touchdown pass to Steve Watson (who finished with 11 receptions for 177 yards). But the Steelers tied the game with quarterback Mark Malone's 10-yard touchdown to Louis Lipps.

With 3 and half minutes left in the game, Pittsburgh drove into position for Anderson to attempt a go-ahead field goal, but he missed the kick from 26 yards.  A few plays later, Steelers safety Eric Williams intercepted a pass from Elway and returned it 28 yards to the Broncos' 2-yard line to set up Pollard's winning 1-yard touchdown run.

Malone finished the game with 227 passing yards and a touchdown.  Elway threw for 184 yards and two scores, but was sacked four times and intercepted twice. This was Elway's first playoff game as a starter; because of the Broncos' elimination, he was denied the opportunity to play in the only Super Bowl to be held at his college home field, Stanford Stadium.  The Steelers outgained Denver in total yards 381-250 and held them to just 51 yards on the ground.  Running back Sammy Winder, who rushed for 1,153 yards during the season, was held to just 37 yards on 15 carries.

This was the third postseason meeting between the Steelers and Broncos. Both teams split the prior two meetings.

Conference Championships

Sunday, January 6, 1985

AFC: Miami Dolphins 45, Pittsburgh Steelers 28

Pittsburgh racked up 455 yards of offense and converted 54% of their third downs, but it still wasn't enough to keep pace with Miami, who gained 569 yards in 71 plays en route to their fifth Super Bowl in franchise history.  Dolphins quarterback Dan Marino led the Dolphins to a victory by throwing for 421 yards and 4 touchdowns (both AFC championship records) with 1 interception.  Marino's record setting day was particularly noteworthy considering he threw his last pass with 11:05 left in the game. Steelers quarterback Mark Malone recorded 312 yards and 3 touchdowns, but was intercepted 3 times.

Miami scored first on Marino's 40-yard touchdown pass to wide receiver Mark Clayton, but Pittsburgh countered with running back Rich Erenberg's 7-yard rushing touchdown. Then after Dolphins kicker Uwe von Schamann made a 26-yard field goal, the Steelers took the lead, 14–10, with wide receiver John Stallworth's 65-yard touchdown reception. Marino struck back with a 41-yard touchdown to wide receiver Mark Duper.  Then Dolphins safety Lyle Blackwood picked off a pass from Malone and returned it 4 yards to the Steelers 35.  After an 11-yard run by Tony Nathan, the Dolphins suffered a setback when a touchdown pass was wiped out by a penalty.  But Marino easily shook this off, completing a 28-yard pass to tight end Joe Rose at the 1-yard line on the next play.  Nathan finished off the drive with a 2-yard touchdown run to give Miami a 24-14 halftime lead.

On the opening drive of the second half, Marino completed a 36-yard touchdown pass to Duper. Then after Stallworth caught a 19-yard touchdown, the Dolphins scored two more touchdowns, including Marino's fourth score, to clinch the victory. Malone threw a 29-yard touchdown pass to Wayne Capers in the final period to close out the scoring.

"We threw every defense we had at the guy -- zones, man-to-man, double- coverage, you name it, but the ball always seemed to get there before we did," Steelers safety Donnie Shell said. "The guy is incredible. He deserves what he's going to get, and to me that looks like a Super Bowl ring."

Duper finished the game with 5 receptions for 148 yards and 2 touchdowns. Clayton caught 4 passes for 95 yards and a score. Nathan rushed for 61 yards and a touchdown, while also catching 8 passes for 114 yards. Stallworth caught 4 passes for 111 yards and 2 touchdowns in the final postseason game of his Hall of Fame career.

This was the third postseason meeting between the Steelers and Dolphins. Both teams split the previous two meetings.

NFC: San Francisco 49ers 23, Chicago Bears 0

The 49ers gained 387 yards while limiting the Bears to 186, with just 37 yards through the air.  Chicago quarterback Steve Fuller completed just 13 of 22 passes for 87 yards and was sacked 9 times (twice each by Gary Johnson and Michael Carter).

Neither team played particularly well in the first half. Chicago took the opening kickoff and moved the ball 54 yards, 29 on carries by Walter Payton.  But the drive stalled at the 49ers 23 and ended with no points when Bob Thomas missed a 41-yard field goal attempt.  San Francisco then drove to the Chicago 2-yard line in 8 plays, but quarterback Joe Montana fumbled the snap on third down and had to dive on the ball.  After that, Ray Wersching kicked a 21-yard field goal to make the score 3-0.  49ers safety Dwight Hicks gave the team a great chance to increase their lead more by intercepting a pass from Fuller in Chicago territory.  San Francisco made it all the way to the 2-yard line again, but this time they did not even get a field goal as Montana was intercepted in the end zone by safety Gary Fencik.

A 66-yard drive to the Bears 4-yard set up Wersching's second field goal in the second quarter, giving the 49ers a 6-0 lead.  Meanwhile, the Bears offense would go the entire period without gaining a first down.  Fencik intercepted another pass from Montana, but Chicago could not do anything with the turnover opportunity.

Midway through the third quarter, the 49ers got into the end zone on a 5-play drive in which they never passed the ball.  Running back Wendell Tyler rushed three times on it for 25 yards, the last carry a 9-yard score.  Montana later threw a 10-yard touchdown pass to Freddie Solomon and Wersching finished off the scoring with a 34-yard field goal.

This was the first postseason meeting between the Bears and 49ers.

Super Bowl XIX: San Francisco 49ers 38, Miami Dolphins 16

This was the first Super Bowl meeting between the Dolphins and 49ers.

References

Total Football: The Official Encyclopedia of the National Football League
The Sporting News Complete Super Bowl Book 1995

National Football League playoffs
Playoffs
Los Angeles Rams postseason